Terry Thomas Allen Jr. (born February 21, 1968) is an American former football player who was a running back in the National Football League (NFL) for 11 seasons. Allen played college football for Clemson University.  In the 1990 NFL Draft, he was selected in the ninth round by the Minnesota Vikings.

Between 1992 and 1996, Allen had 4 consecutive seasons of rushing for 1,000 or more yards, minus the 1993 season which he missed completely due to an injury. Terry is married to Annette Allen and they have two daughters,Shayna and Haley Allen.

Professional career

Minnesota Vikings
During Allen's rookie season, he was the second string running back behind Herschel Walker. The next season, the Vikings named Allen as the starter, and he rushed for 1,201 yards and 13 touchdowns. He also caught 49 passes for 478 yards and 2 touchdowns. In the summer of 1993, Allen tore his ACL in practice and missed the entire 1993 season. In 1994, Allen returned. Despite dealing with two bad ACL's, he was able to amass 1,031 rushing yards and 8 touchdowns.

Washington Redskins
Allen joined the Washington Redskins for the 1995 season and rushed for 1,309 yards and 10 touchdowns. During the 1996 season, his second with the Redskins, he gathered 21 rushing touchdowns; only 9 other running backs ever rushed for over 20 touchdowns in a single season. He also had another career best in the 1996 season; besides 21 rushing touchdowns, he ran for 1,353 yards, which earned him a spot in the Pro Bowl. After the 1996 season, he played with Washington for only two more seasons and ran for 700 or more yards in each season.

New England Patriots
In 1999, Allen played for the New England Patriots, where he ran for nearly 900 yards with 8 rushing touchdowns.

New Orleans Saints
Allen had the worst season of his career with the New Orleans Saints in 2000, when he was forced into action after starting running back Ricky Williams broke his ankle.

Baltimore Ravens
On August 12, 2001, Allen signed with the Ravens following a season ending injury to Jamal Lewis, reuniting with Brian Billick, who was his offensive coordinator with the Vikings. He led the Ravens in rushing yards in his one season with the team, rushing for 658 yards.

NFL career statistics

References

1968 births
Living people
People from Commerce, Georgia
American football running backs
Clemson Tigers football players
Minnesota Vikings players
Washington Redskins players
New England Patriots players
New Orleans Saints players
Baltimore Ravens players
National Conference Pro Bowl players
Ed Block Courage Award recipients